Edwin Marshall can refer to:
Edwin Marshall (cricketer) (active 1937–1945), English cricketer, played for Nottinghamshire
Roy Marshall (Roy Edwin Marshall, 1930–1992), West Indian cricketer
Eddie Marshall (1938–2011), American jazz drummer
Edwin Marshall Klein, unsuccessful candidate in Liverpool City Council election, 1980
Edwin L. Marshall, American producer of 2006 film After... (film)

See also 
Edwin Marshall & Sons, English company, builder of Trafford Town Hall in 1931–1933
Edward C. Marshall (1821–1893), American congressman from California